Liu Haitao may refer to:

 Liu Haitao (canoeist) (born 1983), Chinese sprint canoeist
 Liu Haitao (pool player) (born 1982), Chinese professional pool player